Fisher's Lane is  a national historic district located on East Logan Street in the Wister neighborhood of Philadelphia, Pennsylvania. The district includes 12 contributing buildings and 3 contributing structures in a residential section of Wister.  The houses are representative of the Second Empire and Italianate-styles of architecture.

Specific properties include those at numbers 39, 53, 69, 75, and 81 on the northwest side of East Logan Street and 48, 62, 76, 82, and 90–92 on the southeast side.  The artist Joseph Pennell lived at 75 East Logan as a teenager.  One of his early works depicting "the ugly house across the street" won a prize in a school art show, presented to him by the state.

It was added to the National Register of Historic Places in 1980.

References

Houses on the National Register of Historic Places in Philadelphia
Historic districts in Philadelphia
Italianate architecture in Pennsylvania
Second Empire architecture in Pennsylvania
Wister, Philadelphia
Historic districts on the National Register of Historic Places in Pennsylvania